Rosenhaus is a surname. Notable people with the surname include:

Drew Rosenhaus (born 1966), American sports agent
Jim Rosenhaus, American radio broadcaster